Macrocoma cylindrica is a species of leaf beetle found in southern Spain. It was first described by Heinrich Carl Küster in 1846, as a species of Pachnephorus. A subspecies or variety of the species later described from Morocco, M. c. vaucheri, is now considered a synonym of Macrocoma setosa.

References

cylindrica
Beetles of Europe
Endemic fauna of Spain
Endemic insects of the Iberian Peninsula
Beetles described in 1846